The Guardafui Channel is an oceanic strait off the tip of the Horn of Africa that lies between the Puntland region of Somalia and Socotra to the west of the Arabian Sea. It connects the Gulf of Aden to the north with the Indian Ocean to the south. Its namesake is Cape Guardafui, the very tip of the Horn of Africa. Notable places of interest include the Alula Lagoon.

Extent
Gardafuul, a province of the semi-autonomous region of Puntland, is named after it. In its narrower sense, Marinka Gardafuul, in English called the Guardafui Channel, refers to the strait between Puntland and Abd al Kuri.

Names
The oceanic strait goes by many names, including the Ras Hafun Strait, named after the headland of Ras Hafun, near the town of Foar, the Ras Asir-Socotra Strait, the Cape Guardafui Strait, the Guardafui-Socotra Channel Guardafui Channel Cape Guardafui Channel, Socotra Strait, and Socotra Passage.

History
The oceanic strait has been regarded as a possibly dangerous pitfall both during peace and war times. It was a highly strategic region during World War Two. Due to its possession by an Axis power at the time, Italy, The Allies attempted to secure passage through the oceanic strait in the Operation Chapter. Subsequently, the Allies decided that in order to continue routing independent ships and convoys, air cover was needed. The oceanic strait also experiences cyclones that emerge from its southeast in the Somali sea. There is a dispute between the Somali government and Yemen over the sovereignty of its islands. The presence of an archipelago has also meant that there are shores for stranded sailors to find shelter, which on occasion has subsequently resulted in their evacuations.

Geography
To the northwest, it connects with the Gulf of Aden, to the northeast with the Arabian Sea and to the south with the Somali sea. The passage contains the islands of Abd al Kuri, Darsah and Samhah. Ships passing the strait use the Francesco Crispi lighthouse in Cape Guardafui as a navigational aid. On the western mainland on the Horn African coast, lie the Puntite localities of Aluula, Ras Filuk, Cape Guardafui, Bereeda, Tohen and Bargal.

Geology
The northern reaches of the Guardafui Channel lies at the Gulf of Aden Oligocene - Miocene oceanic floor; here water depths reach in excess of 2500 m. The Guardafui Channel, as well as the island chain of the Socotra archipelago are located in the Somali Plate.

See also
 Strait of Sicily

References

External links

 
Somalia
International straits
Bodies of water of Somalia